The 2015 Pinty's All-Star Curling Skins Game was held from January 16 to 18 at The Fenlands Banff Recreation Centre in Banff, Alberta.

The competition format in this edition of the TSN Skins Game reverts to the format used prior to 2013, in which four teams will play a simple knockout bracket to determine the winner. In addition, a women's event was added to the TSN Skins Game for the first time since 2003.

Men
Team Glenn Howard was originally invited, but opted to compete in the Challenge Round for the 2015 Ontario Tankard after failing to advance through the regional qualifier. Since the challenge round will be held on the same weekend as the TSN Skins game, Team McEwen replaced Team Howard.

Teams

Team Jacobs
Soo Curlers Association, Sault Ste. Marie, Ontario

Skip: Brad Jacobs
Third: Ryan Fry
Second: E. J. Harnden
Lead: Ryan Harnden

Team Koe
Glencoe Curling Club, Calgary, Alberta

Skip: Kevin Koe
Third: Marc Kennedy
Second: Brent Laing
Lead: Ben Hebert

Team McEwen
Fort Rouge Curling Club, Winnipeg, Manitoba

Skip: Mike McEwen
Third: B. J. Neufeld
Second: Matt Wozniak
Lead: Denni Neufeld

Team Morris
Glencoe Curling Club, Calgary, Alberta

Skip: John Morris
Third: Pat Simmons
Second: Carter Rycroft
Lead: Nolan Thiessen

Results
All times listed in Eastern Standard Time.

Semifinals
Morris vs. Koe
Saturday, January 17, 11:00 am

Jacobs vs. McEwen
Saturday, January 17, 9:00 pm

Final
Sunday, January 18, 8:00 pm

Winnings
The prize winnings for each team are listed below:

Women

Teams

Team Carey
Saville Sports Centre, Edmonton, Alberta

Skip: Chelsea Carey
Third: Laura Crocker
Second: Taylor McDonald
Lead: Jen Gates

Team Homan
Ottawa Curling Club, Ottawa, Ontario

Skip: Rachel Homan
Third: Emma Miskew
Second: Joanne Courtney
Lead: Lisa Weagle

Team Jones
St. Vital Curling Club, Winnipeg, Manitoba

Skip: Jennifer Jones
Third: Kaitlyn Lawes
Second: Jill Officer
Lead: Dawn McEwen

Team Sweeting
Saville Sports Centre, Edmonton, Alberta

Skip: Val Sweeting
Third: Lori Olson-Johns
Second: Dana Ferguson
Lead: Rachelle Brown

Results
All times listed in Eastern Standard Time.

Semifinals
Homan vs. Sweeting
Friday, January 16, 8:00 pm

Jones vs. Carey
Saturday, January 17, 4:00 pm

Final
Sunday, January 18, 3:00 pm

Winnings
The prize winnings for each team are listed below:

Notes

References

External links

Pinty's All-Star Curling Skins Game
Banff, Alberta
Curling in Alberta
Pinty's All-Star Curling Skins Game
TSN Skins Game
Pinty's All-Star Curling Skins Game